Basketball at the 2018 Asian Games was held in Jakarta, Indonesia from 14 August to 1 September 2018 and contested two events: 5x5 and 3x3 basketball. This was the first Asian Games tournament for 3x3 basketball.

Schedule

Medalists

Basketball

3x3 basketball

Medal table

Draw
The official draw for both the men's and women's basketball events were held on 5 July 2018 in Jakarta. The teams were seeded based on their final ranking at the 2014 Asian Games.

Men

Group A
 (1)
 (8)

Group B
 (2)
 (7)*

*

Group C
 (3)
 (6)

Group D
 (4)
 (5)
*

*  The Philippines and Palestine withdrew after the draw. On 5 August, the Philippines, through a hastily-made press conference by their national basketball federation, decided to field a team but they were placed in Group D to balance the number of teams in each group. the United Arab Emirates withdrew few days before the start of the competition.

Women

Group X
 (1)
 (4)

Group Y
 (2)
 (3)

Final standing

Basketball

Men

Women

3x3 basketball

Men

Women

References

External links
Basketball at the 2018 Asian Games
Basketball 3x3 at the 2018 Asian Games
Official Result Book – Basketball 5x5
Official Result Book – Basketball 3x3

 
Basketball
2018
International basketball competitions hosted by Indonesia
2018–19 in Asian basketball